The Carlton Tower Jumeirah is a luxury hotel in London, England. Owned and managed by the Emirati firm Jumeirah, it is located on Cadogan Place next to Sloane Street and close to Harrods, Harvey Nichols and central Knightsbridge. There are three restaurants and bars, which include The Rib Room Bar & Restaurant, and Chinoiserie.

History
The hotel opened on 5 January 1961 as The Carlton Tower, managed by Hotel Corporation of America. In 1970, that chain was renamed Sonesta Hotels, and the hotel was briefly renamed the Sonesta Tower Hotel. UK-based Lex Hotels assumed management in 1971, and the hotel regained its original name. In 1977, the hotel's owners, Prudential Assurance, sold the property to Proteus Hotels.

Hyatt Hotels assumed management in 1982, and the hotel was renamed the Hyatt Carlton Tower. When Hyatt's 20-year contract ran out, Jumeirah took over management in December 2001, and the hotel was renamed Jumeirah Carlton Tower. In 2011, to celebrate its 50th year, the hotel published ‘All That Life Can Afford’.

In September 2019 the hotel closed for a £100 million renovation. It reopened on 27 July 2021, rebranded slightly as The Carlton Tower Jumeirah.

The hotel was voted "Best UK Business Hotel" at the Conde Nast Reader's Travel Awards in 2008 as well as Conde Nast Middle East Readers’ Choice Awards 2013 - Best International Business Hotel.

The hotel was awarded "England's Best Business Hotel" for three consecutive years (from 2011 to 2013) at the World Travel Awards and has been nominated every year since.

The hotel found itself amid controversy in 2009 when The Telegraph reported a banker's naked corpse was found by a member of staff.

References

External links 
Official website

Hotels in London
Hotels established in 1961
Hotel buildings completed in 1961
Knightsbridge